The Cimetière de Grenelle is a 64 are cemetery on rue Saint-Charles in Grenelle, in the 15th arrondissement of Paris. It was set up in 1835 and annexed to the city of Paris in 1860. Those buried there include Louis Madelin and the Schmid and Rémondot families.

References

External links
 

Cemeteries in Paris
Buildings and structures in the 15th arrondissement of Paris
1835 establishments in France